Lidia Palladievna Sergievskaya (1897–1970) was a Soviet botanist, professor, and herbarium curator.  She described over 100 plants.

References 

1897 births
1970 deaths
Soviet women scientists
Soviet botanists